Dowlatabad (also Romanized as Dowlatābād and Daulatābād) is a village in Pachehlak-e Gharbi Rural District, in the Central District of Azna County, Lorestan Province, Iran. At the 2006 census, its population was 634, in 132 families. It is located just to the southeast of Cheshmeh Soltan.

References 

Towns and villages in Azna County